Thucca in Numidia was an Ancient Roman era town and the seat of an ancient Bishopric during the Roman Empire, which remains only as a Latin Catholic titular see.

History 
The city in the Roman province of Numidia, and has been tentatively identified with ruins at modern Henchir-El-Abiodh, present Algeria, was important to become one of its many suffragan dioceses, in the papal sway, yet was destined to fade.

Two of its residential Bishops are historically documented :
 Saturninus, recorded in 255
 Sabinus, in 411

The city and bishopric lasted till the 7th century Muslim conquest of the Maghreb, today it is incorporated into northern Algeria.

Titular see 
The diocese was nominally restored in 1933 as Latin titular bishopric Thucca in Numidia (Latin) / Tucca di Numidia (Curiate Italian) / Thuccen(sis) in Numidia (Latin adjective).

It has had the following incumbents, of the fitting Episcopal (lowest) rank with an Eastern Catholic and an (other) archiepiscopal exception: 
 Juan Vicente Solís Fernández (1967.03.30 – death 1973.01.16) as emeritate, formerly Bishop of Alajuela (Costa Rica) (1940.07.03 – retired 1967.03.30)  
 Federico Richter Fernandez-Prada, Friars Minor (O.F.M.) (1973.04.12 – 1975.09.20 see below) as Auxiliary Bishop of Archdiocese of Piura (Peru) (1973.04.12 – 1975.09.20)
 Titular Archbishop: Federico Richter Fernandez-Prada, O.F.M. (see above 1975.09.20 – 1979.11.20) as Coadjutor Archbishop of Ayacucho (Peru) (1975.09.20 – 1979.11.20), later succeeding as Metropolitan Archbishop of Ayacucho (1979.11.20 – retired 1991.05.23), died 2011
 Jean-Baptiste Tiendrebeogo (1981.11.05 – 1996.03.30) as Auxiliary Bishop of Archdiocese of Ouagadougou (Burkina Faso) (1981.11.05 – 1996.03.30), later Bishop of Kaya (Burkina Faso) (1996.03.30 – death 1998.05.14)
 Joseph Perumthotttam (2002.04.24 – 2007.01.22) as Auxiliary Bishop of Changanacherry of the Syro-Malabars (India) (2002.04.24 – 2007.01.22), later succeeding as Metropolitan Archeparch (Archbishop) of Changanacherry of the Syro-Malabars (India) (2007.01.22 – ...)
 Liro Vendelino Meurer (2009.01.14 – 2013.04.24) as Auxiliary Bishop of Archdiocese of Passo Fundo (Brazil) (2009.01.14 – 2013.04.24); later Bishop of Santo Ângelo (Brazil) (2013.04.24 – ...)
 Bishop-elect Martin David (2017.04.07 – ...), Auxiliary Bishop of Diocese of Ostrava–Opava (Czech Republic)  (2017.04.07 – ...), no previous prelature.

See also 
 List of Catholic dioceses in Algeria
 Thucca in Mauretania, nearby episcopal see (now titular)

References

Sources and external links 
 GCatholic - data for the titular see
 Catholic-hierarchy
 Bibliography 
 Pius Bonifacius Gams, Series episcoporum Ecclesiae Catholicae, Leipzig 1931, p. 469
 Stefano Antonio Morcelli, Africa christiana, Volume I, Brescia 1816, p. 334

Catholic titular sees in Africa
Former Roman Catholic dioceses in Africa
Roman towns and cities in Algeria
Suppressed Roman Catholic dioceses
Ancient Berber cities